François de Bovet (March 21, 1745, Grenoble – April 6, 1838, Paris) was bishop of Sisteron from 1789 to 1812, and from 1817 to 1820 was archbishop of Toulouse.

He was consecrated as bishop on September 13, 1789, in Paris. Due to religious persecution he had to leave France for much of the Revolution. He did not resign his bishopric in line with the Concordat of 1801, but instead held on to his diocese until 1812. 
Since the  consecrator of him is not known and some of the bishops alive today can trace their episcopal lineage back to him, the person of  François de Bovet is very important for the history of the Catholic Church.  This so-called de Bovet lineage includes eight members of the episcopate scattered between Malaysia (four), Indonesia (one), Taiwan (one) and China (two).

Works 
1797: Réflexions sur un prétendu bref du 5 juillet 1796 
1801: Réflexions sur la promesse de fidélité à la constitution
1817: Observations de Monseigneur de Bovet, évêque de Sisteron
1819: Les Consolations de la foi sur les malheurs de l'Église 
1835: Les dynasties égyptiennes
1835: Histoire des derniers pharaons et des premiers rois de Perse, selon Hérodote, tirée des livres prophétiques et du livre d'Esther (2 vol.) 
1840: L'Esprit de l'Apocalypse

References

Clergy from Grenoble
1745 births
1838 deaths
19th-century Roman Catholic archbishops in France
Bishops of Sisteron
Archbishops of Toulouse
French Egyptologists